Beidaud is a commune in Tulcea County, Northern Dobruja, Romania. 

The commune includes three villages:
 Beidaud
 Neatârnarea (Caildere until 1908)
 Sarighiol de Deal

The commune's name is of Turkish origin, being a compound of the words bey and Daut, derived from David. Thus, the name means "village of the bey David".

References

Communes in Tulcea County
Localities in Northern Dobruja
Aromanian settlements in Romania
Place names of Turkish origin in Romania